John Robert Meyer (March 23, 1932 – March 6, 1967) was an American professional baseball right-handed pitcher, who appeared in all or parts of seven Major League (MLB) seasons (1955–1961) with the Philadelphia Phillies.

Born in Philadelphia, Meyer came from a '"well-to-do New Jersey family," was educated at the exclusive William Penn Charter School, and attended the University of Delaware and Wake Forest University.

Meyer signed with the Phillies in 1951 and steadily rose through their farm system, winning 15 games for the 1954 Syracuse Chiefs of the Triple-A International League (IL). His most successful MLB season was his 1955 rookie campaign, when he led the National League (NL) in both saves (16) and games finished (36), while fanning 97 batters in 110 innings pitched. Meyer also made five starts, and wound up finishing second to Bill Virdon in NL Rookie-of-the-Year Award balloting. However, Meyer’s effectiveness then began to fade and he spent part of 1957 back in Triple-A.

Meyer rebounded to post respectable seasons in both 1958 and 1959, largely in middle relief, but his career was negatively affected by his growing reputation as a drinker and late-night carouser. He was a member — along with fellow pitchers Turk Farrell and Jim Owens — of the so-called "Dalton Gang", who received notoriety around baseball for multiple, and well-publicized, off-field incidents.

Meyer, who was given the nickname of "The Bird", went on the disabled list with a herniated disk and was fined $1,200 (nine percent of his salary) after a bout of post-game drinking in Pittsburgh in May 1960 led to confrontations with two sportswriters and Phillies' broadcaster Byrum Saam, then a fight with Farrell and several teammates, which left Meyer injured. He missed the remainder of the 1960 season and only pitched in one more game, in 1961, before leaving baseball.

For his MLB career, Meyer compiled a 24–34 record in 202 appearances, most of them as a relief pitcher, with a 3.92 earned run average (ERA), and 375 strikeouts.

Meyer suffered a heart attack while watching a basketball game on television and died on March 6, 1967, at Thomas Jefferson University Hospital in Philadelphia. Only 34 years old, he had a history of heart problems. Meyer left a wife and three children.

His nephew, Brian Meyer, pitched briefly in MLB, for the Houston Astros, from 1988 to 1990.

See also
 List of Major League Baseball annual saves leaders

References

External links

1932 births
1967 deaths
Baseball players from Philadelphia
Bradford Phillies players
Major League Baseball pitchers
Miami Marlins (IL) players
Philadelphia Phillies players
Schenectady Blue Jays players
Syracuse Chiefs players
Wake Forest University alumni
Wilmington Blue Rocks (1940–1952) players
William Penn Charter School alumni